Triston Jay Amero (1982 – April 1, 2008)  was an American who was found guilty of the hotel bombings that killed two people and wounded seven others in Bolivia on  March 22, 2006. The bombings damaged two low-rent hotels. A third bombing was stopped.

Amero, who also went by the names as Claudio Lestad, Lestat Claudius de Orleans y Montevideo  and John Scheda, was from New Orleans, Louisiana. He had reportedly been hospitalized for psychiatric treatment and had been in juvenile prison several times, beginning at age seven. He had wandered around Latin America for some years before settling in the Bolivian city of Potosí in 2004. In posts from Colombia to his blog he repeatedly described himself as a loner, a "political refugee" and "the Superman of Loosers" [sic] whose strongest desire was to distance himself from the United States.

Although the Bolivian police were unsure of the motive for the bombings that led to Amero's arrest, President Evo Morales declared: "This American was putting bombs in hotels."  "The U.S. government fights terrorism, and they send us terrorists," he said. Morales denounced the bombings as an attack on Bolivia's democracy. He called it "typical of terrorist crime." This caused a brief cooling of U.S.-Bolivian relations.

Deputy Interior Minister Rafael Puente told Radio Fides: "The possible motives behind these attacks are incomprehensible. There don't seem to be any concrete objectives other than causing deaths."

Amero and an accomplice, Alda Ribiero Acosta of Uruguay, were arrested by police in a hotel in the slum of El Alto, formally charged with murder, and were held in a maximum security prison near La Paz. While there, Amero attempted to stab his lawyer and had gasoline hidden in his cell, with plans to set fire to a prison official and a U.S. diplomat. Amero was sentenced to 30 years in prison on January 23, 2008.

At the age of 26, Amero died in a hospital on April 1, 2008, after complaining of stomach pains while in prison.

References

1982 births
2008 deaths
21st-century American criminals
People from New Orleans
People imprisoned on charges of terrorism
American people imprisoned abroad
American people who died in prison custody
Prisoners who died in Bolivian detention
American people convicted of murder
People convicted of murder by Bolivia
2006 murders in Bolivia
Bombers (people)